Ishtiqaq is the Arabic term for "derivation" or "etymology". It may refer to
a branch of traditional Arabic grammar, see Arabic grammar
a 9th-century work by Ibn Qutaybah
Kitab ul-Ishtiqaq, a 10th-century work by Ibn Duraid.
a lost work by Abu Ishaq al-Shatibi (d. 1388)

Arabic words and phrases